The women's team compound competition at the 2011 World Archery Championships took place on 4–9 July 2011 in Torino, Italy. 22 teams of three archers competed in the qualification round on 4 July; the top 16 teams qualified for the knockout tournament on 6 July, with the semi-finals and finals on 9 July.

Top seeds United States won the competition, defeating Iran in the final.

Seeds
Seedings were based on the combined total of the team members' qualification scores in the individual ranking rounds. The top 16 teams were assigned places in the draw depending on their overall ranking.

Draw

References

2011 World Archery Championships
World